The Saline Branch, or Saline Branch Ditch, is a tributary of the Vermilion River in east central Illinois.  It drains a parcel of east-central Champaign County, including most of the city of Urbana, Illinois and the University of Illinois campus within Urbana.

Extensive engineering work from the late 1800s through the early 1900s, completed in 1908, straightened and ditched the once-wandering creek.  It discharges into the Salt Fork of the Vermilion River; the discharge includes outflow from the Urbana-Champaign Sanitary District.  The U.S. Geographic Names Information System (GNIS) states an alternate name for this stream is West Branch Salt Fork.

References

External links
Home Town Locator: Saline Branch Drainage Ditch in Champaign County IL
The News-Gazette: Movement looking to ditch streams' many names

Rivers of Champaign County, Illinois
Rivers of Illinois